Forever Young is the eleventh comedy album released by Northern Irish comedian and actor James Young and the second to be released posthumously.

At the time of his death, Young had been working on a new album for release. Young's custom was that all material should be reviewed before release to ensure its quality. When Young died, Emerald Music decided not to release the material. Emerald were persuaded to release the material, however, with additional background music and effects.

Track listing

Side 1
 James "Foo" Young
 The Lord Mayor Speaks
 The Crabbed old woman 
 Ulster's Space Man
 Our Wee Boy
 James Joins Up
 Hilda

Side 2
 Oh Come Ye to Ulster 
 What's On Tonight 
 The Wife (Big Aggie)
 An American View of Ulster
 School Days
 My Old Slum Clearance Home
 The P.M. Speaks

References

James Young (comedian) albums
1988 albums
Albums published posthumously